The Oak Hill Mausoleum, now Oak Hill Chapel, is a historic religious and funerary building in Oak Hill Cemetery, the oldest cemetery in Siloam Springs, Arkansas.

The massive granite Classical Revival structure was built in 1916 with funding raised by a local citizen group, and originally had a capacity of 72 burials.  The mausoleum was designed by Cecil E. Bryan with an interior following a standard plan he used on other small mausoleums.  The exterior is what sets this mausoleum apart from others he designed.  He was inspired by the works of his former employer, Louis Sullivan.

The building deteriorated in condition, and its burials were relocated elsewhere within the cemetery.  It was rescued from demolition and restored for use as a chapel.  The building is regionally distinctive, because northwestern Arkansas is not known for having mausoleums at all, and the heavy stonework and Classical Revival styling are also fairly rare in the area.

The building was listed on the National Register of Historic Places in 1996.

See also
National Register of Historic Places listings in Benton County, Arkansas

References

Properties of religious function on the National Register of Historic Places in Arkansas
Neoclassical architecture in Arkansas
Buildings and structures completed in 1916
Buildings and structures in Siloam Springs, Arkansas
Churches in Benton County, Arkansas
National Register of Historic Places in Benton County, Arkansas